Richard G. Ditlevsen Jr. (July 13, 1957) is an American businessman and former stunt performer.

Stunt career
Born  in Sacramento, California, Ditlevsen became a stunt performer in his early career. He worked with the National Enquirer's chief photo editor, Bill Graham, for 15 years. Ditlevsen was featured in many two page centerfolds for the National Enquirer, National Examiner, Star Magazine as well as other print syndications worldwide. In a notable stunt, he rode his jet-ski through the hull of a large river boat, exiting the other side as the boat breaks up in pieces. He was nearly knocked from his jet-ski when particle board impaled one arm, falling from the jet-ski he managed to hoist himself back to the seat landing no handed. In another he took that jet-ski over a ramp that led him through multiple walls of flaming boards fixed over 120 feet over the river. He escaped with his tuxedo intact and only minor singes to his lower back hair. He is also featured in Jeff Werners new book, Incredible Stunts.
In 1991, Ditlevsen was inducted into the Stuntworld Hall of fame for achieving 39 world records and still holds 35 of those records. These accomplishments earned him the title of "The Ultimate Stuntman" and his kevlar plated jet-ski became an icon.

Media career
In the early 1990s, Ditlevsen became an artist, and a prolific television producer. While producing over 750 television shows, he became a television syndicator and in 1991 founded the Extreme Sports Television Network (ESN, LLC airing on Comcast). Nielsen rated the network the number 1 sports network by market share out performing NASCAR on FOX April 5, 2005. ESN was purchased by Triple Action Entertainment, Inc. a California corporation for $20 million. As CEO of Triple Action Entertainment, Inc., Ditlevsen plans a national launch and worldwide syndication of ESN, as extreme sports translate to any language.

Ditlevsen is also writing a book, No Money, No Talent, How I made it to the top, with plans to launch in 2009  explaining how he built a world media empire.

Notes

American stunt performers
1957 births
Living people